Taqdeer Ka Badshah is a 1982 Indian Hindi-language Indian film directed by B. Subhash, starring Mithun Chakraborty, Ranjeeta, Pran, Amjad Khan, Vijay Arora, Suresh Oberoi. The music was composed by Bappi Lahiri.

Cast
Mithun Chakraborty as Ratan 
Ranjeeta as Bindiya 
Pran as Shankar 
Amjad Khan as Bhola / Nath
Vijay Arora as Anil
Suresh Oberoi as William
Asit Sen as College Principal
Geeta Siddharth as Shanti 
Satyendra Kapoor as Jailor
Vijayendra Ghatge as Inspector Prakash
Tamanna as Neelam 
Birbal as Motu 
Jagdish Raj as Advocate

Soundtrack
Lyrics: Anjaan

References

External links
 
 http://www.ibosnetwork.com/asp/filmbodetails.asp?id=Taqdeer+Ka+Badshah

1982 films
1980s Hindi-language films
Films scored by Bappi Lahiri
Films directed by Babbar Subhash